The Church of Prophet Elijah (Naós Profíti Ilía) is a 14th-century church in Thessaloniki, Greece, and a UNESCO World Heritage Site.

The church is located in the upper quarter of the old city, and dates to the Palaiologan period, but its original dedication is unknown. In Ottoman times, it was known as the Saraylı Mosque (Palace Mosque or Court Mosque), and through a misinterpretation of this name came about its modern dedication to the Prophet Elijah. It has been traditionally identified as the katholikon of the Nea Moni monastery, built ca. 1360–1370 on the site of a former palace destroyed in 1342 by the Zealot uprising. Modern research, however, has cast doubt on this, since the Nea Moni continued to operate well into the Ottoman period, while the church of Prophet Elijah was converted into a mosque by Badrah Mustafa Pasha immediately after the city's capture in 1430. On the basis of its internal decoration, it has been suggested that the church was the katholikon of the important Akapniou Monastery.

Its architectural style, a variant of cross-in-square church known as the "Athonite type", is unique in the city, and was always reserved for katholika of monasteries. The careful masonry, of alternating courses of bricks and white ashlar, is also unusual for Thessaloniki and its region; it is copied from Constantinopolitan architecture. Several of its architectural features have also been interpreted as set to create an ambient atmosphere directly connected with the type of worship, through the way natural light is distributed. Fragments of the church's original decoration survive in the form of wall paintings, fine examples of late Palaiologan art, which influenced later paintings in Serbia.

References

Sources
 
Iliadis, I. E. (2018), The church of Elijah the Prophet in Thessaloniki; Geometry and Natural Light, Archaeology & Arts (archaeology.wiki)

External links
 

Byzantine church buildings in Thessaloniki
World Heritage Sites in Greece
14th-century Eastern Orthodox church buildings
Mosques converted from churches in Ottoman Greece
Former mosques in Greece
14th-century churches in Greece
14th-century establishments in the Byzantine Empire